The 1914 Iowa State Cyclones football team represented Iowa State College of Agricultural and Mechanic Arts (later renamed Iowa State University) in the Missouri Valley Conference during the 1914 college football season. In their second and final season under head coach Homer C. Hubbard, the Cyclones compiled a 4–3 record (2–1 against conference opponents), finished in third place in the conference, and outscored opponents by a combined total of 167 to 78. Lew Reeve was the team captain.

Schedule

References

Iowa State
Iowa State Cyclones football seasons
Iowa State Cyclones football